Elsie Bambridge (2 February 1896 – 24 May 1976) was the second daughter of British writer Rudyard Kipling. She was the only one of the Kiplings' three children to survive beyond early adulthood.

On 22 October 1924, Elsie Kipling married George Bambridge and in 1938 they bought Wimpole Hall, Cambridgeshire's largest stately home.  Her obituary, in The Times, stated she had two missions in life, "to maintain the traditions of her husband Captain George Bambridge and her father Rudyard Kipling".  On her death, in 1976, having no children, she bequeathed her property and its contents to the National Trust.  The Trust later donated her father's manuscripts to the University of Sussex in Brighton, to ensure better public access to them.  She is buried in the graveyard of St Andrew's Church on the estate.

See also
 Frederick Smith, 2nd Earl of Birkenhead, author of a biography about Bambridge's father, which she did not allow to be published

References

External links 

 Rudyard Kipling Papers and other Kipling related collections at The Keep, University of Sussex

1896 births
1976 deaths
People from Dummerston, Vermont
Family of Rudyard Kipling
People from Wimpole